The 2004 200 km of Buenos Aires is the first edition of this race on the TC2000 season.
The race was held in the Autódromo Juan y Óscar Gálvez in Buenos Aires.

Results 

Buenos Aires 200km
Buenos Aires